Dwelling is the second album by American singer-songwriter Melissa Greener; it was released on January 12, 2010. The album was produced by John Jennings who has produced several albums for Mary Chapin Carpenter. It was recorded and mixed by Jennings at Red Hill in Charlottesville, Virginia. The album cover's photography and art was by Traci Goudie.

One of the tracks on the album, "Bullets to Bite", won first prize in the folk category of the 2009 USA Songwriting Competition. Greener performed "Bullets to Bite" in episode 13 in series 1 of the television documentary Troubadour, TX, first aired on February 10, 2012.

Track listing

References

External links
 

2010 albums
Melissa Greener albums